Viktoria Balzhanova (born 11 May 1988) is a Russian compound archer. She is the current World Archery number ten in women's compound archery. The highest ranking she has reached is the fourth position, which she reached for the last time in June 2011.

Achievements
Source:
		

2008
4th, World University Championships, individual, Tainan
2009
 World Cup, women's team, Poreč
 European Grand Prix, women's team, Sofia
 Summer Universiade, individual, Belgrade
 Summer Universiade, women's team, Belgrade
 World Cup, women's team, Shanghai
 World Outdoor Championships, women's team, Ulsan
43rd, World Outdoor Championships, individual, Ulsan
2010
 World Cup, women's team, Poreč
 European Outdoor Championships, individual, Rovereto
 European Outdoor Championships, women's team, Rovereto
 World Cup, women's team, Antalya
 World Cup, mixed team, Ogden, Utah
 World Cup, women's team, Shanghai

2011
 World Cup, individual, Poreč
 World Cup, women's team, Poreč
 EMAU Grand Prix, women's team, Boé
 EMAU Grand Prix, mixed team, Boé
 EMAU Grand Prix, individual, Boé
6th, World Outdoor Championships, women's team, Turin
33rd, World Outdoor Championships, individual, Turin
 Summer Universiade, women's team, Shenzhen
 Summer Universiade, individual, Shenzhen
8th, Summer Universiade, mixed team, Shenzhen
 World Cup, women's team, Shanghai
, European Outdoor Championships, women's team, Cambrils
2012
 World Indoor Championships, individual, Las Vegas
 World Indoor Championships, women's team, Las Vegas
4th, European Outdoor Championships, women's team, Amsterdam
9th, European Outdoor Championships, individual, Amsterdam

References

External links
 

Russian female archers
Living people
1988 births
Universiade medalists in archery
Universiade silver medalists for Russia
Universiade bronze medalists for Russia
Medalists at the 2011 Summer Universiade